The Company You Keep is the eighth studio album by folk singer-songwriter John Gorka. It was released on March 13, 2001, by Red House Records.

The album debuted at number two on the Folk Music Radio Airplay Chart for March 2001 and was ranked sixth on the year-end chart for 2001. The tracks receiving the most airplay were "What Was That", "Oh Abraham", "Let Them In", and "People My Age".

Consistent with previous albums, many of Gorka's musician friends join him on various tracks.  His guests include such talents as Ani DiFranco, Mary Chapin Carpenter, Lucy Kaplansky, Rich Dworsky, Patty Larkin, John Jennings, Dean Magraw, and Peter Ostroushko.

Track listing 
All songs written by John Gorka.
 "What Was That" – 5:17 
 "A Saint's Complaint" – 4:08 
 "Oh Abraham" – 4:21 
 "When You Walk In" – 3:21 
 "Shape of the World" – 3:03 
 "Morningside" – 3:46 
 "When I Lost My Faith" – 4:48 
 "Joint of No Return" – 2:58 
 "Let Them In" – 4:53 
 "Over There" – 2:35 
 "Hank Senior Moment" – 2:06 
 "Around the House" – 3:20 
 "Wisheries" – 5:53 
 "People My Age" – 2:16

Personnel
 Mary Chapin Carpenter – Harmony 
 Ani DiFranco – Guitar, Harmony 
 Richard Dworsky – Organ, Piano, Production Assistant 
 Dirk Freymuth – Guitar 
 Rob Genadek – Engineer, Mastering, Mixing 
 Heidi Gerber – Remote Recording 
 Goatboy – Remote Recording 
 John Gorka – Guitar, Tambourine, Vocals, engineer 
 Fred Harrington – Engineer 
 Gordon Johnson – Bass 
 Kathleen Johnson – Harmony 
 Lucy Kaplansky – Harmony 
 Shane T. Keller – Engineer 
 Patty Larkin – Guitar (Electric), Remote Recording 
 Dean Magraw – Guitar 
 Michael Manring – Bass, Remote Recording 
 Ann Marsden – Photography 
 Peter Ostroushko – Fiddle 
 Andy Stochansky – Percussion, Drums 
 Tommy Tucker – Engineer, Mixing

References

External links 
 The Company You Keep, lyrics and samples from official John Gorka web site
 The Company You Keep page from Red House Records
 [ The Company You Keep] entry at the Allmusic

John Gorka albums
2001 albums
Red House Records albums